Noyal-sur-Brutz is a commune in the Loire-Atlantique department in western France.

Geography
The village lies above the left bank of the river Brutz (a tributary of the Semnon), which flows west through the northern part of the commune.

The river Verzée forms part of the commune's southern border.

Population

See also
Communes of the Loire-Atlantique department

References

Communes of Loire-Atlantique